¡Vampiros en La Habana! (English title: Vampires in Havana) is a 1985 Cuban animated film directed by Juan Padrón and features trumpet performances by Arturo Sandoval. A sequel to the film, called Más vampiros en La Habana (English title: More Vampires in Havana!), was released in 2003.

Plot
Joseph Amadeus von Dracula, known as Pepe or Pepito to his friends, is a trumpet player in 1930s Havana. He spends his time away from the bandstand dabbling in quasi-terrorist plots to overthrow the Cuban government of Gerardo Machado. Von Dracula is unaware that he is really a vampire, and that his uncle Werner Amadeus von Dracula, the son of Count Dracula, has been using him as a test subject for a formula that negates the usually fatal effects of sunlight.

A Chicago-based crime syndicate and a group of vampires with members from several countries in Europe have both learned of the formula and wish to possess it for different reasons—the Chicago group to suppress it and thus maintain their monopoly on indoor, artificial beach resorts, and the Europeans to market it as "Vampisol."  When Pepe learns of his true heritage (and his uncle's wish to give the formula away to vampires everywhere) he becomes the target of a multi-pronged manhunt, leading all parties involved on a wild chase through some of the seediest neighborhoods of Havana.

At the film's climax, Pepe and his girlfriend Lola find themselves cornered by the Chicago vampire cartel, led by vampire mobster Johnny Terrori. He tells Pepe to have some O positive blood as his last drink, the blood type which vampires consider to be the most delicious. However, when he spits it out in disgust, Terrori realizes that Pepe's dislike of drinking blood, the fact that he was harmed by a lead bullet earlier (vampires can only be harmed by silver bullets), and that he is completely impervious to sunlight (it instantly kills vampires) means that Pepe has stopped being a vampire.

Terrori loses interest in the Vampisol formula, realizing that its effect is to turn vampires into humans. However, the leader of the European vampires suggests a deal with his counterparts from Chicago, whereby they can encourage vampires to take small amounts of Vampisol in the summer and visit the mobsters' artificial beaches in the winter. Both groups believe that they are going to make a fortune from Vampisol but, as a final resolution, Pepe sings instructions on how to prepare the formula over the radio to vampires worldwide, instructing them to use it sparingly to avoid becoming human. The Vampisol formula becomes financially worthless and both vampire cartels find themselves defeated.

At the very end of the film a vampire addresses the audience and says, "Be careful, because that guy next to you on the beach... might just be a vampire!"

See also 
 List of Cuban films

References

External links

 

1985 films
1985 animated films
Spanish black comedy films
Cuban speculative fiction films
1980s Spanish-language films
Vampires in animated film
Culture in Havana
Cuban animated films
Spanish animated films